Hutchins is an unincorporated community in Scott County, Kansas, United States.

References

Further reading

External links
 Scott County maps: Current, Historic, KDOT

Unincorporated communities in Scott County, Kansas
Unincorporated communities in Kansas